The 1932 Central State Bearcats football team represented Central State Teachers College, later renamed Central Michigan University, as an independent during the 1932 college football season. In their second season under head coach George Van Bibber, the Bearcats compiled a 3–4–1 record (1–2 against MCC opponents), shut out three of eight opponents, and outscored all opponents by a combined total of 95 to 66. The team lost to its in-state rivals Michigan State Normal (0–28) and Western State Teachers (0–7).

Schedule

References

Central State
Central Michigan Chippewas football seasons
Central State Bearcats football